Aleksandr Silvestrovich Alumona (born 18 December 1983) is a Russian football official and a former (forward) of Nigerian ethnic origin. He works as an administrator with Peresvet Podolsk. He has won the Hungary Cup (2005/2006), 3rd Place prize-winner of Hungarian National Championship I, (2005/2006).

Club career
Aleksandr Alumona was a member of the Chekhov team but never made an appearance. He then moved to Serpukhov for the 2003 season, and then to Vác-Újbuda LTC in Hungary. During this time Aleksandr Alumona did not made an appearance. Transferred in 2004  to FC Fehérvár, he made 44 league appearances and scored 4 goals, and also made 8 appearances in the Hungarian Cup, scoring 1 goal. But his big achievement at FC Fehérvár would be his 2 appearances in the UEFA Cup. He then transferred to FC Neman Grodno in 2007, where he made 45 league appearances and scored 19 goals. While at FC Neman Grodno he also made 6 appearances in the Belarusian Cup and scored 4 goals. He then transferred to FC BATE Borisov. On 22 October 2009, seconds after coming on as a substitute, he scored the deciding goal for BATE in a 2:1 home win against AEK F.C. in a Europa League game. On 1 November 2009, he netted his first league goal in the 1:1 away draw against Torpedo Zhodino.
On 7 July 2010, Alumona was transferred to FC Shakhtyor Soligorsk. On 1 August 2010, he scored a hat-trick in the 4:1 home win against FC Neman Grodno.
On 21 November 2010, Alumona scored the winning goal against his former club BATE in a match that ended 1:2.

On 25 July 2012, Alumona moved to FC Gomel on a half-year contract. He made his official debut on 2 August in the 0:1 home loss against Liverpool F.C. in a UEFA Europa League preliminary round match and played his first league match for the team from Gomel on 17 August — a 0:0 away draw with FC BATE Borisov.

Match Fixing

In August 2016, Alumona was one of several Isloch Minsk Raion players alleged to be involved in match fixing during their match with Dinamo Brest on 30 April 2016.
On 20 February 2018, the BFF banned Alumona for 24 months for his involvement in the match fixing between Isloch Minsk Raion and Dinamo Brest in April 2016.

Honours

Club
 FC Fehérvár
 3rd Place in Hungarian National Championship I titles: 2005/06
 1 Hungarian Cup titles: 2005/06

Career statistics

Statistics accurate as of match played 22.10.2009.

Competition statistics
Soproni Liga : 44 appearances 4 goals
Hungarian Cup : 8 appearances 1 goal
Belarusian Premier League : 110 appearances 38 goals
Belarusian Cup : 6 appearances 4 goals
UEFA Cup/UEFA Europa League : 3 appearances 1 goal

References

External links
 Profile at BATE website
 

1983 births
Living people
Footballers from Moscow
Russian footballers
Russia youth international footballers
Russian expatriate footballers
Association football forwards
Expatriate footballers in Hungary
Fehérvár FC players
Russian expatriate sportspeople in Hungary
Expatriate footballers in Belarus
FC BATE Borisov players
Russian people of Nigerian descent
FC Neman Grodno players
FC Shakhtyor Soligorsk players
FC Gomel players
Expatriate footballers in Kazakhstan
FC Tobol players
Vác FC players
FC Naftan Novopolotsk players
FC Belshina Bobruisk players
FC Kaisar players
FC Isloch Minsk Raion players
Kazakhstan Premier League players
FC Tambov players
FC Dynamo Bryansk players
Russian First League players
Russian Second League players